"Like a Drug" may refer to:

 "Like a Drug", song by Kylie Minogue from X
 "Like a Drug", song by Queens of the Stone Age from Lullabies to Paralyze
 "Like a Drug", song by Ty Dolla Sign from Free TC
 "Like a Drug (Sha La La La)", song by Swans from Children of God
 Like a Drug'', mixtape by Canadian rapper Honey Cocaine